Voorhees, Gmelin and Walker was a prestigious New York architectural firm.

The firm had an illustrious heritage, the parent company being founded in New York City by Cyrus L.W. Eidlitz in 1885.  In 1900 he added partner Andrew C. McKenzie and when Eidlitz left the firm in 1910 he was replaced by Stephen F. Voorhees (1878–1965) and Paul Gmelin.  Following McKenzie's death in 1926 Ralph Walker, who had been employed for several years with the company, was added as a partner and the name was changed to Voorhees, Gmelin and Walker.  In 1938, reflecting new changes in the partnership, the name was changed to Voorhees, Walker, Foley and Smith, and in 1955 to  Voorhes, Walker, Smith and Smith.  Mr. Voorhees held a senior partner position until January 1959, when he became a consultant. Following Perry Coke Smith's retirement in 1968, the firm's name was changed to Haines Lundberg Waehler, and in its current form is known today as HLW.

The firm was well known for its Art Deco buildings.

Notable commissions
The following are all in New York City unless otherwise noted:
 Justice Court Building, Glen Cove, New York
 Barclay-Vesey Building, 1920–1926
 340 West 55th Street, originally the National Bible Institute School and Dormitory, 1922-1924
 New Jersey Bell Headquarters Building, Newark, New Jersey,  1929
 Times Square Building, Rochester, New York,  1929
 60 Hudson Street, 1930
 1 Wall Street (Irving Trust Company Building) 1932
 32 Avenue of the Americas, 1932
 The Grace Rainey Rogers Auditorium inside The Metropolitan Museum of Art, 1954
 Chesapeake and Potomac Telephone Company Building, Washington, D.C.

References

 Wilson, Richard Guy,  The AIA Gold Medal, McGraw-Hill Book Company, New York,  1984  p 184-185

External link

Defunct architecture firms based in New York City
1885 establishments in New York (state)